Dogma 19 is a movement in DIY music production developed in the late 2010s by interdisciplinary artists, vocalists and members of The Unilalia Group, an independent label based in Washington state. It is an adaptation of the logic and principle behind Dogme 95, a Danish filmmaking movement, this time applied to the arena of the voice as opposed to the moving image.

History 
Characterized early on as "strange Ugly Mane-esque satirical seriousness", music coming from The Unilalia Group (before and after incorporation) has always demonstrated a low-budget approach to pushing creative and stylistic boundaries in the studio of the vocalist. Dogma 19 represents a conventionalization of this approach, now packaged and ready for distribution.

Overview 
Dogma 19 is a critical reaction to the advent of social media and its transformation of the art world, consumption patterns, and the palette of the consumer. Pulled directly from its manifesto: "The purpose of Dogma 19 is to cultivate a new authenticity in the workrooms and studios of the vocalist in particular – the advent of clout culture and its copy and paste styles of expression have contributed to a decline of artistry in exchange for cultural assimilation. Public channels become flooded with oversaturated, redundant, duplicative content while access points are simultaneously consolidated. Multimedia conglomerates and subsidiary labels alike project baseless archetypes, coded messages, and manufactured associations which in turn shape the cultural palette of today's consumer – entertainment has conquered creativity as capital drives the art world, irrespective of medium."A set of rules and restrictions were developed to rejuvenate the creative process; vocalists are forced to depend solely on their own individual talent, ingenuity, and intelligence in the composition of a Dogma 19 record.

Rules and objectives 
Dogma 19 seeks to purify the creative process of the vocalist by forbidding the use of expensive, artificial, and otherwise spectacular special effects, pitch correction, modifications and other technical gimmicks (autotune, quantizers, and so on). It is a challenge, a test, a ritualization of the vocalist's approach designed to raise talent and ingenuity to the forefront of the audience's concerns. Listeners are brought closer to the artist, their attention no longer distracted by overproduction. Dogma 19 records are characterized by a conformation to the following rules:

 All writing and recording must be done alone, in isolation. Ghostwriters, writing in groups, or anything remotely similar is absolutely forbidden. 
 Vocalist must only use GarageBand. External plugins are forbidden. Built-in plugin use limited to Pitch Shifter, Fuzz-Wah, Compressor, and Channel EQ only. Any use of autotune, metronomes, quantizers, or anything similar is forbidden. 
 Vocalist must do all mixing and engineering by themselves. All outside assistance is forbidden. 
 All instrumentation must be externally sourced and licensed; no track-outs allowed under any circumstances. 
 Vocalist must record in same space they sleep in: all professional studios are forbidden.
 Features are forbidden, no exceptions. 
 Records must be conceptual narrative works. 
 Lo-fi genre records are not acceptable. 
 Budget must not exceed $500 
 Labels must not be credited.

Examples of Dogma 19 Records 

 To Unilalia: Official Trailer (2019)
 The Highway (2019)

Notes & references 

Music production